We Are the Dream: The Kids of the Oakland MLK Oratorical Fest is a HBO documentary film. The film features young people who participate in a public speaking competition honoring the legacy of Martin Luther King Jr. It tied with The Dark Crystal: Age of Resistance for the 2020 Primetime Emmy Award for Outstanding Children's Program.

References

External links 
 

2020 films
2020 documentary films
2020 television films
2020s English-language films
American documentary television films
HBO documentary films
Films about Martin Luther King Jr.
2020s American films